The Seelow Heights are situated around the town of Seelow, about  east of Berlin, and overlook the Oderbruch, the western flood plain of the River Oder, which is a further  to the east.

They are sometimes known as the "Gates to Berlin", because the main eastern route out of Berlin runs through them.

Second World War

During April 1945, the Battle of the Seelow Heights saw some of the heaviest fighting of the Second World War between the German defenders and the Soviet attackers. The fighting took place on the horseshoe-shaped plateau of the Seelow Heights. Many localised Soviet attacks were held back by remnants of the Wehrmacht. The Soviet advances could not be held off for long. After several days of intense fighting, the Soviets managed to break through the defences and fight their way into the German capital in the Battle of Berlin.

Geography of Brandenburg
heights